René Sommerfeldt (born 2 October 1974 in Zittau) is a German cross-country skier who competed from 1994 to 2010. He won two medals in the 4 × 10 km relays at the Winter Olympics with a silver in 2006 and a bronze in 2002. Sommerfeldt's best individual Olympic finish was 12th in the 15 km event in 2006.

Sommerfeldt also has three medals at the FIS Nordic World Ski Championships, earning two silvers (50 km: 2001, 4 × 10 km relay: 2003) and one bronze (4 × 10 km relay: 2001).

He also won the 50 km event at the Holmenkollen Ski Festival in 2004, becoming the second German to win this prestigious honor (the first was Gerhard Grimmer in 1970/71).

Sommerfeldt will become a coach in cross-country skiing for the German team.

Cross-country skiing results
All results are sourced from the International Ski Federation (FIS).

Olympic Games
 2 medals – (1 silver, 1 bronze)

World Championships
 3 medals – (2 silver, 1 bronze)

World Cup

Season titles
 2 titles – (1 overall, 1 distance)

Season standings

Individual podiums
4 victories – (3 , 1 ) 
19 podiums – (17 , 2 )

Team podiums
 2 victories – (2 ) 
 15 podiums – (9 , 6 )

References

External links
 
  
  
 
 

1974 births
Living people
People from Zittau
Cross-country skiers at the 1998 Winter Olympics
Cross-country skiers at the 2002 Winter Olympics
Cross-country skiers at the 2006 Winter Olympics
Cross-country skiers at the 2010 Winter Olympics
German male cross-country skiers
Holmenkollen Ski Festival winners
Olympic cross-country skiers of Germany
Olympic silver medalists for Germany
Olympic bronze medalists for Germany
Olympic medalists in cross-country skiing
FIS Nordic World Ski Championships medalists in cross-country skiing
FIS Cross-Country World Cup champions
Tour de Ski skiers
Medalists at the 2006 Winter Olympics
Medalists at the 2002 Winter Olympics
Sportspeople from Saxony